Museh (also Romanized as Mūseh; also known as Mūsá) is a village in Il Gavark Rural District, in the Central District of Bukan County, West Azerbaijan Province, Iran. At the 2006 census, its population was 196, in 35 families.

References 

Populated places in Bukan County